Ivan Samiylovych Hrushetsky (22 August 1904 – 28 November 1982) was a Ukrainian and Soviet politician, who served as the chairman of Presidium of the Supreme Council of the Ukrainian Soviet Socialist Republic from 1972 to 1976.

Biography
Ivan Hrushetsky was born in a village of Komyshuvakha that today is located in Orikhiv Raion, southern Ukraine.

References

External links

Profile in the Handbook on history of the Communist Party and the Soviet Union 1898–1991

1904 births
1982 deaths
People from Zaporizhzhia Oblast
People from Melitopolsky Uyezd
Ukrainian people in the Russian Empire
Central Committee of the Communist Party of the Soviet Union members
First convocation members of the Soviet of Nationalities
Second convocation members of the Soviet of Nationalities
Third convocation members of the Soviet of Nationalities
Fourth convocation members of the Soviet of Nationalities
Fifth convocation members of the Soviet of Nationalities
Sixth convocation members of the Soviet of Nationalities
Seventh convocation members of the Soviet of Nationalities
Eighth convocation members of the Soviet of the Union
Ninth convocation members of the Soviet of Nationalities
Politburo of the Central Committee of the Communist Party of Ukraine (Soviet Union) members
Head of Presidium of the Verkhovna Rada of the Ukrainian Soviet Socialist Republic
Presidium of the Supreme Soviet
Heroes of Socialist Labour
Recipients of the Order of Lenin
Recipients of the Order of the Red Banner
Recipients of the Order of the Red Banner of Labour
Burials at Baikove Cemetery